Philip Farrer (26 May 1945 – 18 May 1993) was a South African cricketer. He played in one List A and two first-class matches for Border in 1970/71.

See also
 List of Border representative cricketers

References

External links
 

1945 births
1993 deaths
South African cricketers
Border cricketers
Sportspeople from Qonce